Tom Sawyer, Detective is an 1896 novel by Mark Twain. It is a sequel to The Adventures of Tom Sawyer (1876), Adventures of Huckleberry Finn (1884), and Tom Sawyer Abroad (1894). Tom Sawyer attempts to solve a mysterious murder in this burlesque of the immensely popular detective novels of the time. Like Adventures of Huckleberry Finn, the story is told using the first-person narrative voice of Huck Finn.

Film adaptations
In 1938, the novel was made into a film directed by Louis King, starring Billy Cook as Tom and Donald O'Connor as Huckleberry Finn.
A similar incarnation of Tom Sawyer appeared in the film version of The League of Extraordinary Gentlemen, set three years after the publication of this novel. In this film, Tom works for the United States Secret Service, and in the novelization of the film, Sawyer mentions that he once worked as a detective.

Controversy
In 1909, Danish schoolmaster Valdemar Thoresen claimed, in an article in the magazine Maaneds, that the plot of the book had been plagiarized from Steen Blicher's story The Vicar of Weilby.  Blicher's work had been translated into German, but not into English, and Twain's secretary wrote Mr. Thoresen a letter, stating, "Mr. Clemens is not familiar with Danish and does not read German fluently, and has not read the book you mention, nor any translation or adaptation of it that he is aware of.  The matter constituting 'Tom Sawyer, Detective,' is original with Mr. Clemens, who has never been consciously a plagiarist."

However, in an opening note in the book preceding the first chapter (as republished by Gutenberg Press), the author states:

Note: Strange as the incidents of this story are, they
are not inventions, but facts—even to the public confession
of the accused.  I take them from an old-time Swedish
criminal trial, change the actors, and transfer the scenes
to America.  I have added some details, but only a couple of
them are important ones. — M. T.]"

As the story material (the 1626 trial of Pastor Søren Jensen Quist of Vejlby) predated Blicher, Twain/Clemens had as much right to use it as Blicher.

See also
Mark Twain bibliography

References

External links

 
 Tom Sawyer Abroad / Tom Sawyer, Detective, University of California Press, 2004.
 Full Text of Tom Sawyer, Detective online at Mark Twain Classics
 

American mystery novels
American novels adapted into films
Novels by Mark Twain
1896 American novels
Novels involved in plagiarism controversies
First-person narrative novels